Stephen Shore (born October 8, 1947) is an American photographer known for his images of banal scenes and objects, and for his pioneering use of color in art photography. His books include Uncommon Places (1982) and American Surfaces (1999), photographs that he took on cross-country road trips in the 1970s.

In 1975 Shore received a Guggenheim Fellowship. In 1971, he was the first living photographer to be exhibited at the Metropolitan Museum of Art in New York City, where he had a solo show of black and white photographs.  He was selected to participate in the influential group exhibition "New Topographics: Photographs of a Man-Altered Landscape", at the International Museum of Photography at the George Eastman House (Rochester, New York), in 1975-1976.

In 1976 he had a solo exhibition of color photographs at the Museum of Modern Art. In 2010 he received an Honorary Fellowship from the Royal Photographic Society.

Life and work 
Shore was born as sole son of Jewish parents who ran a handbag company. He was interested in photography from an early age. Self-taught, he received a Kodak Junior darkroom set for his sixth birthday from a forward-thinking uncle. He began to use a 35 mm camera three years later and made his first color photographs. At ten he received a copy of Walker Evans's book, American Photographs, which influenced him greatly. His career began at fourteen, when he presented his photographs to Edward Steichen, then curator of photography at the Museum of Modern Art (MoMA) in New York. Recognizing Shore's talent, Steichen bought three black and white photographs of New York City. At sixteen, Shore met Andy Warhol and began to frequent Warhol's studio, the Factory, photographing Warhol and the creative people that surrounded him. In 1971, he was the first living photographer to be exhibited at the Metropolitan Museum of Art in New York City, with a show of black and white, sequential images.

Shore then embarked on a series of cross-country road trips, making "on the road" photographs of American and Canadian landscapes. In 1972, he made the journey from Manhattan to Amarillo, Texas, that provoked his interest in color photography. Viewing the streets and towns he passed through, he conceived the idea to photograph them in color, first using 35 mm hand-held camera and then a 4×5" view camera before finally settling on the 8×10 format. The change to a large format camera is believed to have happened because of a conversation with John Szarkowski. In 1974 a National Endowment for the Arts (NEA) grant funded further work, followed in 1975 by a Guggenheim Fellowship.

Along with others, especially William Eggleston, Shore is recognized as one of the leading photographers who established color photography as an art form. His book Uncommon Places (1982) was influential for new color photographers of his own and later generations. Photographers who have acknowledged his influence on their work include Nan Goldin, Andreas Gursky, Martin Parr, Joel Sternfeld and Thomas Struth.

Shore photographed fashion stories for Another Magazine, Elle, Daily Telegraph and many others. Commissioned by Italian brand Bottega Veneta, he photographed socialite Lydia Hearst, filmmaker Liz Goldwyn and model Will Chalker for the brand's spring/summer 2006 advertisements.

Shore has been the director of the photography department at Bard College since 1982.

His American Surfaces series, a travel diary made between 1972 and 1973 with photographs of "friends he met, meals he ate, toilets he sat on", was not published until 1999, then again in 2005.

In recent years, Shore has been working in Israel, the West Bank, and Ukraine.

Publications

Publications by Shore
Uncommon Places. New York: Aperture, 1982. .
The Gardens at Giverny. New York: Metropolitan Museum of Art, 1983. ASIN B002GRGN1A.
The Velvet Years, Andy Warhol's Factory, 1965–1967. New York: Thunder's Mouth, 1995. .
Stephen Shore: Photographs 1973–1993. Munich: Schirmer Art Books, 1998. .
American Surfaces.
Munich: Schirmer/Mosel: 1999. . Contains 77 photographs. 
London: Phaidon, 2005, 2008, 2011, 2013. . Expanded edition with 312 photographs, an introduction by Bob Nickas and captions.
Uncommon Places: 50 Unpublished Photographs. Düsseldorf: Verlag der Galerie Conrads, 2002. .
Uncommon Places: The Complete Works. London: Thames & Hudson, 2004; New York: Aperture, 2004. .
Essex County. Portland, OR: Nazraeli Press, 2006. .
Witness No.1. Portland, OR: Nazraeli Press, 2007. ASIN B000OFFDEY.
A Road Trip Journal. London: Phaidon, 2008 .
One Picture Book #43 Merced River. Portland, OR: Nazraeli Press, 2009. .
Stephen Shore. Dublin: Douglas Hyde Gallery, 2010. .
Mose: A Preliminary Report. Berlin: Walther König, 2011. .
The Hudson Valley. Annandale-on-Hudson, NY: Blind Spot Series, 2012. .
One Picture Book #73 Pet Pictures. Portland, OR: Nazraeli Press, 2012. .
From Galilee to the Negev. London: Phaidon, 2014. .
Winslow Arizona. Tokyo: Amana, 2014. . Text in English and Japanese.
Stephen Shore: Survey. Madrid: Fundación Mapfre, 2014. . With an interview between David Campany and Shore, and texts by Marta Dahó, Sandra S. Phillips, and Horacio Fernández.
Survivors in Ukraine. London: Phaidon, 2015. .
Luzzara. London: Stanley Barker, 2016. .
Transparencies: Small Camera Works 1971–1979. London: Mack, 2020. . With an afterword by Britt Salvesen, "Ordinary Speech: The Vernacular in Stephen Shore's Early 35mm Photography".

Photographic theory by Shore
The Nature of Photographs
Baltimore, MD: Johns Hopkins University Press, 1998. .
London: Phaidon, 2007. .
Modern Instances: the Craft of Photography. London: Mack, 2022. .

Publications with contributions by Shore
The New Color Photography. New York: Abbeville, 1981. . Text by Sally Eauclaire.
New Color/New Work. Abbeville, 1984. . Text by Sally Eauclaire.
American Independents: Eighteen Color Photographers. New York: Abbeville, 1987. . Includes work by Larry Babis, Jim Dow, William Eggleston, Mitch Epstein, David T. Hanson, John Harding, Len Jenshel, Nancy Lloyd, Kenneth McGowan, Roger Mertin, Joel Meyerowitz, Richard Misrach, Joanne Mulberg, Stephen Scheer, Stephen Shore, Joel Sternfeld, Jack D. Teemer, Jr., and Daniel S. Williams. Text by Sally Eauclaire.

Solo exhibitions
1971: Metropolitan Museum of Art, New York City.
1972: Light Gallery, New York City. The first exhibition of his American Surfaces photographs.
1976: Museum of Modern Art (MoMA), New York City.
1978: Rencontres d'Arles, Arles, France.
2010: Rencontres d'Arles, Arles, France.
2012: Stephen Shore, Uncommon Places, Multimedia Art Museum, Moscow.
2016: Stephen Shore. Retrospective, C/O Berlin, Berlin.
2017–2018: Stephen Shore, Museum of Modern Art, New York City.

Awards

1974: National Endowment for the Arts Fellowship.
1975: Guggenheim Fellowship from the John Simon Guggenheim Memorial Foundation.
2010: Royal Photographic Society Honorary Fellowship.
2010: Culture Award, German Society for Photography (DGPh), Germany.

References

External links
Shore's website
Shore talks about his work at SFMOMA, April 2012.
Interview with Canadian critic Christopher Brayshaw
Masters of Photography
Artworks by Stephen Shore in the collection of The Metropolitan Museum of Art, New York
303 Gallery artist page for Stephen Shore

1947 births
American photographers
20th-century American Jews
Bard College faculty
Living people
National Endowment for the Arts
People associated with The Factory
New Topographics photographers
21st-century American Jews